Sence is a village in the municipality of Mavrovo and Rostuša, North Macedonia.

Demographics
According to the 2002 census, the village had a total of 21 inhabitants. Ethnic groups in the village include:

Albanians 15
Macedonians 5
Bosniaks 1

References

Villages in Mavrovo and Rostuša Municipality
Albanian communities in North Macedonia